Maltese Sign Language (LSM) is a young sign language of Malta. It developed into its modern form c. 1980 with the establishment of the first deaf club in Malta and subsequently with its use in education for the deaf. LSM's prior history is unrecorded, though there are some signs which indicate contact with British Sign Language (Malta was a British colony until 1964). These signs are relatively few, however, and LSM is not part of the BSL family.

Maria Galea has described the use of SignWriting when used to write Maltese Sign Language.

The Maltese public broadcaster PBS Ltd. began airing a nightly newscast in LSM on its TVM2 network in 2012.

References
Notes

Bibliography
Marie Azzopardi-Alexander, "Iconicity and the development of Maltese Sign Language", in Fabri, ed., Maltese Linguistics: A Snapshot, 2009

Sign language isolates
Languages of Malta